Fivemile Branch is a stream in the U.S. state of Georgia. It is a tributary to Muckalee Creek.

Variant names are "Five Mile Branch" and "Five Mile Creek".

References

Rivers of Georgia (U.S. state)
Rivers of Lee County, Georgia
Rivers of Sumter County, Georgia